Ankyrin repeat domain 33 is a protein that in humans is encoded by the ANKRD33 gene.

References

Further reading